Bonrepos-Riquet (Languedocien: Bonrepaus Riquet) is a commune in the Haute-Garonne department in southwestern France.

Population
The inhabitants of the commune are known as Riquetois.

See also
Communes of the Haute-Garonne department

References

Communes of Haute-Garonne